The Schuchya is a river in Yamalo-Nenets Autonomous Okrug, Russia, a left tributary of the Ob. It discharges into the Malaya Ob, a left branch of the Ob.

References

External links 
 Щучья in the Great Soviet Encyclopedia

Rivers of Yamalo-Nenets Autonomous Okrug